The Colorado Rockies' 1997 season was the fifth for the Major League Baseball (MLB) franchise located in Denver, Colorado, their fifth in the National League (NL), and third at Coors Field. The team competed in the National League West, finishing in third place with a record of 83–79.  Right fielder Larry Walker won the NL Most Valuable Player Award (MVP), becoming the first Rockies player and Canadian-born player to do so in MLB.

In a season of contrasting dynamics, the Rockies led the NL in attendance, runs scored, batting average, on-base percentage (OBP), and slugging percentage.  However, the club was last in earned run average (ERA), as only Roger Bailey and John Thomson pitched enough innings to qualify for the ERA title and both produced ERAs under 5.00.  Walker, Vinny Castilla, and Andrés Galarraga each hit at least 40 home runs.  Walker led the NL in home runs with 49 and OBP (.452), and the major leagues in on-base plus slugging (1.172), while Galarraga led the NL in runs batted in (140).

Offseason
November 28, 1996: Armando Reynoso was traded by the Colorado Rockies to the New York Mets for Jerry DiPoto.
December 9, 1996: Kirt Manwaring was signed as a free agent by the Colorado Rockies.
January 15, 1997: Juan Uribe was signed as an amateur free agent by the Colorado Rockies.
January 24, 1997: Darnell Coles was signed as a free agent by the Colorado Rockies.
March 26, 1997: Steve Decker was released by the Colorado Rockies.

Regular season
The Rockies commenced the 1997 season on the road.  Larry Walker hit two home runs in the season-opening series against the Reds in Cincinnati, and, on April 5, hit three more versus the Montreal Expos in Montreal for his first career three home run game.  His first week accomplishments included a .440 batting average with six home runs in 25 at bats and the Player of the Week Award for the second time in his career on April 6.  Walker concluded the month of April batting .456 with 41 hits, 29 runs scored, 11 home runs, 29 runs batted in (RBI), seven stolen bases, .538 on-base percentage (OBP), .911 slugging percentage (SLG), and 1.449 on-base plus slugging percentage (OPS).  His 29 runs scored set a major league record for the month of April, until surpassed by Bryce Harper in 2017.  Walker was named NL Player of the Month for the first time.  The Rockies concluded the month of April with a 17–7 record for a .708 winning percentage, their most successful month of 1997.

Perhaps the most famous home run first baseman Andrés Galarraga hit was a mammoth grand slam off Kevin Brown on May 31, which landed 20 rows deep into the upper deck at Florida Marlins' Pro Player Stadium. At the time, it set a record for both the Rockies and the stadium.

In the June 20 contest versus the San Diego Padres, Walker collected his 108th hit of the season and the 1,000th of his career while batting against Andy Ashby.

Walker continued to hit near or above .400 in July, when he was selected to play in the All-Star Game.  His remarkable season continued: as late as July 17, he was hitting .402.  The Rockies struggled in the month of July, losing 19 of 27 games for a .296 winning percentage.

Third baseman Vinny Castilla replicated the exact totals in batting average (.304), home runs (40), and RBI (113) as he had produced in 1996, with one fewer game played (159) and one point less in slugging percentage (.547).

The Rockies led the NL in attendance at more than 3.88 million.  They also led the league in runs scored (923), home runs (239), batting (.288), OBP (.357), and SLG (.478).  They were last in ERA at 5.25.

The career season for Walker was 1997, when he hit .366 with 49 home runs, 130 RBI, 33 stolen bases, and 409 total bases, en route to becoming the first Canadian-born and Colorado Rockies player to win the MVP Award in MLB.  Combined with 12 outfield assists, the season remains one of the finest all around performances in recent baseball history. Even more impressively, Walker's breakout season came just one year after various injuries limited him to 83 games and 272 at-bats, although the NL Comeback Player of the Year award went to Darren Daulton.

Season standings

Record vs. opponents

Transactions
May 23, 1997: Darnell Coles was purchased by the Hanshin Tigers (Japan Central) from the Colorado Rockies.
June 3, 1997: Aaron Cook was drafted by the Colorado Rockies in the 2nd round of the 1997 amateur draft. Player signed July 13, 1997.
June 3, 1997: Chone Figgins was drafted by the Colorado Rockies in the 4th round of the 1997 amateur draft. Player signed June 9, 1997.
July 27, 1997: Craig Counsell was traded by the Colorado Rockies to the Florida Marlins for Mark Hutton.
August 19, 1997: Eric Young was traded by the Colorado Rockies to the Los Angeles Dodgers for Pedro Astacio.
August 20, 1997: Bill Swift was released by the Colorado Rockies.

Major League debuts
Batters:
Todd Helton (Aug 2)
Pitchers:
Mike DeJean (May 2)
John Thomson (May 11)
Bobby Jones (May 18) 
Marshall Z. Richards (Jul 21)

Roster

Game log 

|-  style="text-align:center; background:#fbb;"
| 1 || April 1 || @ Reds || 11–4 || Smiley (1–0) || Ritz (0–1) || Jarvis (1) || 54,820 || 0–1
|-  style="text-align:center; background:#fbb;"
| 2 || April 2 || @ Reds || 5–3 || Burba (1–0) || Swift (0–1) || Shaw (1) || 20,210 || 0–2
|-  style="text-align:center; background:#bfb;"
| 3 || April 3 || @ Reds || 7–1 || Thompson (1–0) || Schourek (0–1) || || 22,660 || 1–2
|-  style="text-align:center; background:#bfb;"
| 4 || April 4 || @ Expos || 5–4 || Wright (1–0) || Valdes (0–1) || Ruffin (1) || 19,890 || 2–2
|-  style="text-align:center; background:#bfb;"
| 5 || April 5 || @ Expos || 15–3 || Bailey (1–0) || Cormier (0–1) || || 30,919 || 3–2
|-  style="text-align:center; background:#bfb;"
| 6 || April 6 || @ Expos || 6–2 || Ritz (1–1) || Bullinger (0–1) || || 15,690 || 4–2
|-  style="text-align:center; background:#bfb;"
| 7 || April 7 || Reds || 13–2 || Swift (1–1) || Burba (1–1) || Holmes (1) || 48,014 || 5–2
|-  style="text-align:center; background:#bfb;"
| 8 || April 9 || Reds || 13–4 || Thompson (2–0) || Bones (0–1) || || 50,095 || 6–2
|-  style="text-align:center; background:#bfb;"
| 9 || April 12 || Expos || 12–8 || Wright (2–0) || Bullinger (0–2) || DiPoto (1) || 50,010 || 7–2
|-  style="text-align:center; background:#fbb;"
| 10 || April 13 || Expos || 8–3 || Pérez (2–0) || Ritz (1–2) || Daal (1) || 50,029 || 7–3
|-  style="text-align:center; background:#bfb;"
| 11 || April 14 || Expos || 10–8 || DiPoto (1–0) || Stull (0–1) || Ruffin (2) || 48,011 || 8–3
|-  style="text-align:center; background:#bfb;"
| 12 || April 15 || @ Cubs || 10–7 || Thompson (3–0) || Foster (0–1) || || 15,496 || 9–3
|-  style="text-align:center; background:#bfb;"
| 13 || April 16 || @ Cubs || 4–0 || Bailey (2–0) || Castillo (0–3) || || 13,890 || 10–3
|-  style="text-align:center; background:#fbb;"
| 14 || April 18 || Braves || 14–0 || Glavine (3–0) || Wright (2–1) || || 48,070 || 10–4
|-  style="text-align:center; background:#fbb;"
| 15 || April 19 || Braves || 8–7 || Neagle (2–0) || Ritz (1–3) || Bielecki (1) || 48,065 || 10–5
|-  style="text-align:center; background:#bfb;"
| 16 || April 20 || Braves || 9–2 || Holmes (1–0) || Smoltz (2–3) || || 48,155 || 11–5
|-  style="text-align:center; background:#bfb;"
| 17 || April 22 || Marlins || 13–4 || Bailey (3–0) || Rapp (2–1) || || 48,034 || 12–5
|-  style="text-align:center; background:#bfb;"
| 18 || April 23 || Marlins || 7–3 || Wright (3–1) || Brown (2–1) || Ruffin (3) || 50,017 || 13–5
|-  style="text-align:center; background:#bfb;"
| 19 || April 25 || @ Cardinals || 5–4 || Ritz (2–3) || Benes (2–2) || Ruffin (4) || 29,675 || 14–5
|-  style="text-align:center; background:#bfb;"
| 20 || April 26 || @ Cardinals || 4–2 || Swift (2–1) || Morris (0–1) || Ruffin (5) || 45,681 || 15–5
|-  style="text-align:center; background:#fbb;"
| 21 || April 27 || @ Cardinals || 6–2 || Osborne (1–2) || Thompson (3–1) || || 30,615 || 15–6
|-  style="text-align:center; background:#bfb;"
| 22 || April 28 || @ Astros || 7–6 (10) || McCurry (1–0) || Wagner (2–1) || Ruffin (6) || 13,510 || 16–6
|-  style="text-align:center; background:#fbb;"
| 23 || April 29 || @ Astros || 3–1 || Wall (1–0) || Bailey (3–1) || Hudek (4) || 13,567 || 16–7
|-  style="text-align:center; background:#bfb;"
| 24 || April 30 || Cubs || 11–5 || Ritz (3–3) || Foster (2–2) || || 48,017 || 17–7
|-

|-  style="text-align:center; background:#bfb;"
| 25 || May 1 || Cubs || 5–4 || Swift (3–1) || Castillo (1–4) || Reed (1) || 48,052 || 18–7
|-  style="text-align:center; background:#fbb;"
| 26 || May 2 || Phillies || 7–4 || Muñoz (1–4) || Thompson (3–2) || Bottalico (6) || 48,031 || 18–8
|-  style="text-align:center; background:#bfb;"
| 27 || May 3 || Phillies || 7–3 || Wright (4–1) || Portugal (0–2) || || 48,050 || 19–8
|-  style="text-align:center; background:#bfb;"
| 28 || May 4 || Phillies || 9–0 || Bailey (4–1) || Maduro (2–3) || || 48,107 || 20–8
|-  style="text-align:center; background:#fbb;"
| 29 || May 5 || Mets || 6–1 || Jones (5–2) || Ritz (3–4) || || 48,036 || 20–9
|-  style="text-align:center; background:#bfb;"
| 30 || May 6 || Mets || 12–11 || Swift (4–1) || Borland (0–1) || Reed (2) || 48,020 || 21–9
|-  style="text-align:center; background:#fbb;"
| 31 || May 7 || Pirates || 14–3 || Wilkins (2–0) || Thompson (3–3) || || 48,056 || 21–10
|-  style="text-align:center; background:#fbb;"
| 32 || May 8 || Pirates || 10–8 || Loaiza (4–0) || Wright (4–2) || Loiselle (2) || 48,050 || 21–11
|-  style="text-align:center; background:#fbb;"
| 33 || May 9 || @ Phillies || 3–1 || Maduro (3–3) || Bailey (4–2) || Bottalico (7) || 13,564 || 21–12
|-  style="text-align:center; background:#fbb;"
| 34 || May 10 || @ Phillies || 5–4 (10) || Bottalico (1–1) || Reed (0–1) || || 17,629 || 21–13
|-  style="text-align:center; background:#fbb;"
| 35 || May 11 || @ Phillies || 3–1 || Schilling (5–3) || Thomson (0–1) || || 21,282 || 21–14
|-  style="text-align:center; background:#bfb;"
| 36 || May 12 || @ Phillies || 9–2 || DeJean (1–0) || Muñoz (1–5) || || 12,603 || 22–14
|-  style="text-align:center; background:#fbb;"
| 37 || May 14 || @ Pirates || 15–10 || Wilkins (3–0) || Reed (0–2) || || 11,841 || 22–15
|-  style="text-align:center; background:#fbb;"
| 38 || May 15 || @ Pirates || 4–3 || Córdova (3–3) || Bailey (4–3) || Rincón (3) || 8,548 || 22–16
|-  style="text-align:center; background:#bfb;"
| 39 || May 16 || @ Mets || 2–1 || Munoz (1–0) || McMichael (3–4) || Ruffin (7) || 15,261 || 23–16
|-  style="text-align:center; background:#fbb;"
| 40 || May 17 || @ Mets || 3–1 || Jones (7–2) || Thomson (0–2) || Franco (12) || 23,987 || 23–17
|-  style="text-align:center; background:#fbb;"
| 41 || May 18 || @ Mets || 10–4 || Kashiwada (1–0) || Ruffin (0–1) || || 22,845 || 23–18
|-  style="text-align:center; background:#fbb;"
| 42 || May 19 || @ Mets || 4–3 || Lidle (2–0) || McCurry (1–1) || || 14,248 || 23–19
|-  style="text-align:center; background:#fbb;"
| 43 || May 20 || @ Giants || 6–3 || Van Landingham (2–2) || Bailey (4–4) || Beck (15) || 12,431 || 23–20
|-  style="text-align:center; background:#bfb;"
| 44 || May 21 || @ Giants || 10–7 || Ritz (4–4) || Rueter (2–1) || Reed (3) || 12,268 || 24–20
|-  style="text-align:center; background:#fbb;"
| 45 || May 22 || @ Giants || 7–2 || Gardner (6–1) || Thomson (0–3) || || 10,811 || 24–21
|-  style="text-align:center; background:#bfb;"
| 46 || May 23 || Astros || 8–7 || Jones (1–0) || Wall (1–2) || Reed (4) || 48,127 || 25–21
|-  style="text-align:center; background:#fbb;"
| 47 || May 24 || Astros || 7–0 || Kile (5–2) || Burke (0–1) || || 48,129 || 25–22
|-  style="text-align:center; background:#bfb;"
| 48 || May 25 || Astros || 8–5 || Bailey (5–4) || García (2–3) || Munoz (1) || 48,222 || 26–22
|-  style="text-align:center; background:#bfb;"
| 49 || May 26 || Cardinals || 9–7 || DeJean (2–0) || Petkovsek (2–4) || Reed (5) || 48,043 || 27–22
|-  style="text-align:center; background:#fbb;"
| 50 || May 27 || Cardinals || 8–6 || Benes (4–4) || Thomson (0–4) || Eckersley (9) || 50,010 || 27–23
|-  style="text-align:center; background:#bfb;"
| 51 || May 29 || @ Marlins || 6–5 || Holmes (2–0) || Nen (4–2) || Reed (6) || 19,145 || 28–23
|-  style="text-align:center; background:#fbb;"
| 52 || May 30 || @ Marlins || 4–3 (12) || Hutton (3–1) || DiPoto (1–1) || || 35,731 || 28–24
|-  style="text-align:center; background:#bfb;"
| 53 || May 31 || @ Marlins || 8–4 || Ritz (5–4) || Brown (5–3) || DeJean (1) || 35,032 || 29–24
|-

|-  style="text-align:center; background:#bfb;"
| 54 || June 1 || @ Marlins || 9–2 || Thomson (1–4) || Helling (1–4) || || 41,816 || 30–24
|-  style="text-align:center; background:#bfb;"
| 55 || June 2 || @ Cardinals || 11–7 || Burke (1–1) || Jackson (1–1) || || 22,653 || 31–24
|-  style="text-align:center; background:#fbb;"
| 56 || June 3 || @ Cardinals || 15–4 || Morris (3–3) || Jones (1–1) || || 34,038 || 31–25
|-  style="text-align:center; background:#fbb;"
| 57 || June 4 || Padres || 7–5 || Cunnane (4–1) || Bailey (5–5) || Bochtler (2) || 48,049 || 31–26
|-  style="text-align:center; background:#bfb;"
| 58 || June 5 || Padres || 9–7 (11) || Reed (1–2) || Burrows (0–1) || || 48,018 || 32–26
|-  style="text-align:center; background:#fbb;"
| 59 || June 7 || Marlins || 7–5 || Heredia (3–0) || Holmes (2–1) || Nen (16) || 48,052 || 32–27
|-  style="text-align:center; background:#bfb;"
| 60 || June 8 || Marlins || 7–2 || Burke (2–1) || Leiter (5–4) || DiPoto (2) || 48,055 || 33–27
|-  style="text-align:center; background:#fbb;"
| 61 || June 8 || Marlins || 9–1 (7) || Fernandez (6–6) || Wright (4–3) || || 48,033 || 33–28
|-  style="text-align:center; background:#bfb;"
| 62 || June 9 || Braves || 8–3 || Bailey (6–5) || Glavine (6–4) || || 48,047 || 34–28
|-  style="text-align:center; background:#fbb;"
| 63 || June 10 || Braves || 8–3 || Neagle (9–1) || Ritz (5–5) || || 48,103 || 34–29
|-  style="text-align:center; background:#bfb;"
| 64 || June 11 || Braves || 9–6 || Thomson (2–4) || Clontz (2–1) || || 48,633 || 35–29
|-  style="text-align:center; background:#fbb;"
| 65 || June 12 || @ Mariners || 12–11 || Wells (2–0) || Munoz (1–1) || Ayala (4) || 37,948 || 35–30
|-  style="text-align:center; background:#fbb;"
| 66 || June 13 || @ Mariners || 6–1 || Johnson (10–1) || Wright (4–4) || || 55,980 || 35–31
|-  style="text-align:center; background:#bfb;"
| 67 || June 14 || @ Athletics || 7–1 || Bailey (7–5) || Wengert (3–4) || || 25,139 || 36–31
|-  style="text-align:center; background:#fbb;"
| 68 || June 15 || @ Athletics || 5–2 || Prieto (5–4) || Ritz (5–6) || Taylor (13) || 24,333 || 36–32
|-  style="text-align:center; background:#fbb;"
| 69 || June 17 || Rangers || 10–8 (11) || Patterson (5–3) || Reed (1–3) || || 48,243 || 36–33
|-  style="text-align:center; background:#bfb;"
| 70 || June 18 || Rangers || 10–9 || Leskanic (1–0) || Wetteland (4–1) || || 43,432 || 37–33
|-  style="text-align:center; background:#bfb;"
| 71 || June 19 || @ Padres || 8–4 || Bailey (8–5) || Jackson (1–4) || || 19,146 || 38–33
|-  style="text-align:center; background:#fbb;"
| 72 || June 20 || @ Padres || 5–2 || Ashby (3–3) || Munoz (1–2) || Hoffman (11) || 20,602 || 38–34
|-  style="text-align:center; background:#bfb;"
| 73 || June 21 || @ Padres || 9–4 || Rekar (1–0) || Bergman (1–2) || || 43,044 || 39–34
|-  style="text-align:center; background:#fbb;"
| 74 || June 22 || @ Padres || 4–2 || Worrell (3–6) || Ruffin (0–2) || Hoffman (12) || 28,893 || 39–35
|-  style="text-align:center; background:#fbb;"
| 75 || June 23 || @ Dodgers || 5–3 || Nomo (7–6) || Ritz (5–7) || Hall (1) || 31,076 || 39–36
|-  style="text-align:center; background:#bfb;"
| 76 || June 24 || @ Dodgers || 6–2 || Holmes (3–1) || Astacio (3–7) || || 45,194 || 40–36
|-  style="text-align:center; background:#fbb;"
| 77 || June 25 || @ Dodgers || 2–0 || Valdez (4–8) || Burke (2–2) || Hall (2) || 30,963 || 40–37
|-  style="text-align:center; background:#bfb;"
| 78 || June 26 || Giants || 7–6 || DeJean (3–0) || Foulke (1–2) || Leskanic (1) || 48,301 || 41–37
|-  style="text-align:center; background:#fbb;"
| 79 || June 27 || Giants || 6–3 || Rueter (5–2) || Thomson (2–5) || Beck (26) || 48,225 || 41–38
|-  style="text-align:center; background:#bfb;"
| 80 || June 28 || Giants || 9–2 || Ritz (6–7) || Gardner (8–4) || || 48,273 || 42–38
|-  style="text-align:center; background:#fbb;"
| 81 || June 29 || Giants || 7–4 || Estes (11–2) || Bailey (8–6) || || 48,384 || 42–39
|-  style="text-align:center; background:#bfb;"
| 82 || June 30 || Angels || 11–7 || DiPoto (2–1) || Gross (1–1) || || 48,359 || 43–39
|-

|-  style="text-align:center; background:#fbb;"
| 83 || July 1 || Angels || 4–1 || Finley (4–6) || Burke (2–3) || Percival (10) || 48,235 || 43–40
|-  style="text-align:center; background:#fbb;"
| 84 || July 2 || @ Rangers || 9–1 || Burkett (6–7) || Thomson (2–6) || || 38,569 || 43–41
|-  style="text-align:center; background:#fbb;"
| 85 || July 3 || @ Rangers || 8–3 || Oliver (5–9) || Ritz (6–8) || || 38,907 || 43–42
|-  style="text-align:center; background:#fbb;"
| 86 || July 4 || @ Giants || 4–0 || Estes (12–2) || Wright (4–5) || Beck (28) || 41,566 || 43–43
|-  style="text-align:center; background:#fbb;"
| 87 || July 5 || @ Giants || 2–1 || Tavárez (2–2) || Munoz (1–3) || Beck (29) || 34,148 || 43–44
|-  style="text-align:center; background:#fbb;"
| 88 || July 6 || @ Giants || 7–0 || Gardner (9–4) || Burke (2–4) || || 28,252 || 43–45
|-  style="text-align:center; background:#fbb;"
| 89 || July 10 || Padres || 11–5 || Ashby (5–5) || Burke (2–5) || || 45,833 || 43–46
|-  style="text-align:center; background:#bfb;"
| 90 || July 11 || Padres || 6–5 (11) || DiPoto (3–1) || Hoffman (3–4) || || 48,053 || 44–46
|-  style="text-align:center; background:#fbb;"
| 91 || July 12 || Padres || 11–7 || Hamilton (7–3) || Swift (4–2) || Hoffman (17) || 48,179 || 44–47
|-  style="text-align:center; background:#fbb;"
| 92 || July 13 || Padres || 13–11 || Batchelor (3–1) || McCurry (1–2) || Hoffman (18) || 48,053 || 44–48
|-  style="text-align:center; background:#fbb;"
| 93 || July 14 || Dodgers || 14–12 (10) || Radinsky (4–1) || Reed (1–4) || Worrell (22) || 48,360 || 44–49
|-  style="text-align:center; background:#fbb;"
| 94 || July 15 || Dodgers || 6–5 || Park (7–5) || Bailey (8–7) || Worrell (23) || 48,621 || 44–50
|-  style="text-align:center; background:#fbb;"
| 95 || July 16 || @ Braves || 2–1 || Glavine (10–5) || DiPoto (3–2) || Wohlers (23) || 48,400 || 44–51
|-  style="text-align:center; background:#fbb;"
| 96 || July 17 || @ Braves || 8–2 || Maddux (13–3) || Swift (4–3) || || 48,024 || 44–52
|-  style="text-align:center; background:#fbb;"
| 97 || July 19 || @ Cubs || 7–0 || Trachsel (5–7) || Wright (4–6) || || || 44–53
|-  style="text-align:center; background:#fbb;"
| 98 || July 19 || @ Cubs || 6–5 || Wendell (3–5) || McCurry (1–3) || Rojas (11) || 40,751 || 44–54
|-  style="text-align:center; background:#bfb;"
| 99 || July 20 || @ Cubs || 9–5 || Leskanic (2–0) || Adams (1–5) || Holmes (2) || 36,861 || 45–54
|-  style="text-align:center; background:#fbb;"
| 100 || July 21 || @ Expos || 8–4 || Urbina (3–6) || Holmes (3–2) || || 20,540 || 45–55
|-  style="text-align:center; background:#bfb;"
| 101 || July 22 || @ Expos || 11–9 (12) || Reed (2–4) || Veres (2–3) || || 22,518 || 46–55
|-  style="text-align:center; background:#bfb;"
| 102 || July 24 || Cubs || 7–1 || Wright (5–6) || Trachsel (5–8) || || 48,294 || 47–55
|-  style="text-align:center; background:#bfb;"
| 103 || July 25 || Cubs || 9–3 || Castillo (7–9) || Foster (10–6) || || 48,279 || 48–55
|-  style="text-align:center; background:#bfb;"
| 104 || July 26 || Cubs || 6–3 || Bailey (9–7) || Mulholland (6–10) || Holmes (3) || 48,108 || 49–55
|-  style="text-align:center; background:#bfb;"
| 105 || July 27 || Cubs || 4–0 || Thomson (3–6) || González (7–4) || || 48,378 || 50–55
|-  style="text-align:center; background:#fbb;"
| 106 || July 28 || Expos || 3–2 || Pérez (10–6) || Swift (4–4) || Urbina (18) || 48,066 || 50–56
|-  style="text-align:center; background:#fbb;"
| 107 || July 29 || Expos || 3–0 || Martínez (12–5) || Wright (5–7) || || 48,117 || 50–57
|-  style="text-align:center; background:#bfb;"
| 108 || July 30 || Expos || 12–6 || Castillo (8–9) || Juden (11–5) || || 48,405 || 51–57
|-  style="text-align:center; background:#fbb;"
| 109 || July 31 || @ Pirates || 4–1 || Schmidt (6–6) || Bailey (9–8) || Loiselle (16) || 16,654 || 51–58
|-

|-  style="text-align:center; background:#bfb;"
| 110 || August 1 || @ Pirates || 7–6 || Reed (3–4) || Rincón (4–5) || DiPoto (3) || 22,657 || 52–58
|-  style="text-align:center; background:#fbb;"
| 111 || August 2 || @ Pirates || 6–5 || Córdova (8–6) || Swift (4–5) || Loiselle (17) || 32,388 || 52–59
|-  style="text-align:center; background:#fbb;"
| 112 || August 3 || @ Pirates || 8–4 || Ruebel (3–2) || Reed (3–5) || || 24,989 || 52–60
|-  style="text-align:center; background:#fbb;"
| 113 || August 4 || @ Phillies || 7–3 || Green (2–1) || Castillo (8–10) || || 15,230 || 52–61
|-  style="text-align:center; background:#bfb;"
| 114 || August 5 || @ Phillies || 4–2 || Holmes (4–2) || Bottalico (2–4) || DiPoto (4) || 16,428 || 53–61
|-  style="text-align:center; background:#bfb;"
| 115 || August 6 || @ Mets || 4–0 || Thomson (4–6) || Mlicki (5–8) || || 26,633 || 54–61
|-  style="text-align:center; background:#fbb;"
| 116 || August 7 || @ Mets || 12–4 || Clark (8–7) || Swift (4–6) || || 29,536 || 54–62
|-  style="text-align:center; background:#bfb;"
| 117 || August 8 || Pirates || 5–3 || Wright (6–7) || Lieber (6–12) || DiPoto (5) || 48,262 || 55–62
|-  style="text-align:center; background:#bfb;"
| 118 || August 9 || Pirates || 8–7 || Munoz (2–3) || Rincón (4–6) || || 48,323 || 56–62
|-  style="text-align:center; background:#bfb;"
| 119 || August 10 || Pirates || 8–7 || Leskanic (3–0) || Wilkins (7–3) || DiPoto (6) || 48,018 || 57–62
|-  style="text-align:center; background:#fbb;"
| 120 || August 12 || Phillies || 5–0 || Beech (1–7) || Thomson (4–7) || || 48,228 || 57–63
|-  style="text-align:center; background:#fbb;"
| 121 || August 13 || Phillies || 12–8 || Leiter (8–12) || Wright (6–8) || || 48,491 || 57–64
|-  style="text-align:center; background:#bfb;"
| 122 || August 15 || Mets || 6–2 || Castillo (9–10) || Reed (10–6) || || 48,308 || 58–64
|-  style="text-align:center; background:#bfb;"
| 123 || August 16 || Mets || 7–5 || Holmes (5–2) || McMichael (7–10) || DiPoto (7) || 48,311 || 59–64
|-  style="text-align:center; background:#bfb;"
| 124 || August 17 || Mets || 6–4 || Thomson (5–7) || Mlicki (5–10) || DiPoto (8) || 48,440 || 60–64
|-  style="text-align:center; background:#fbb;"
| 125 || August 19 || @ Reds || 6–5 || Morgan (5–10) || Wright (6–9) || Shaw (25) || 31,722 || 60–65
|-  style="text-align:center; background:#bfb;"
| 126 || August 20 || @ Reds || 5–3 || Castillo (10–10) || White (1–1) || DiPoto (9) || 21,968 || 61–65
|-  style="text-align:center; background:#fbb;"
| 127 || August 21 || @ Astros || 10–4 || Holt (8–9) || Bailey (9–9) || || 22,962 || 61–66
|-  style="text-align:center; background:#fbb;"
| 128 || August 22 || @ Astros || 9–1 || Kile (17–3) || Thomson (5–8) || || 33,061 || 61–67
|-  style="text-align:center; background:#bfb;"
| 129 || August 23 || @ Astros || 6–3 || Reed (4–5) || Hudek (0–2) || DiPoto (10) || 32,374 || 62–67
|-  style="text-align:center; background:#fbb;"
| 130 || August 24 || @ Astros || 3–1 || Hampton (11–8) || Wright (6–10) || || 28,918 || 62–68
|-  style="text-align:center; background:#fbb;"
| 131 || August 25 || Reds || 7–6 || Martínez (1–0) || Castillo (10–11) || Shaw (26) || 48,143 || 62–69
|-  style="text-align:center; background:#fbb;"
| 132 || August 25 || Reds || 6–4 || White (2–1) || Hutton (3–2) || Shaw (27) || 48,081 || 62–70
|-  style="text-align:center; background:#bfb;"
| 133 || August 26 || Reds || 9–5 || DeJean (4–0) || Martínez (1–1) || || 48,063 || 63–70
|-  style="text-align:center; background:#bfb;"
| 134 || August 27 || Reds || 7–5 || Thomson (6–8) || Remlinger (6–6) || DiPoto (11) || 48,032 || 64–70
|-  style="text-align:center; background:#bfb;"
| 135 || August 28 || Mariners || 9–5 || Astacio (8–9) || Olivares (6–9) || || 48,422 || 65–70
|-  style="text-align:center; background:#bfb;"
| 136 || August 29 || Mariners || 6–5 || DiPoto (4–2) || Timlin (3–3) || || 48,178 || 66–70
|-  style="text-align:center; background:#bfb;"
| 137 || August 30 || Athletics || 4–3 || DiPoto (5–2) || Mohler (1–10) || || 48,308 || 67–70
|-  style="text-align:center; background:#bfb;"
| 138 || August 31 || Athletics || 10–4 || Holmes (6–2) || Oquist (2–5) || || 48,041 || 68–70
|-

|-  style="text-align:center; background:#bfb;"
| 139 || September 1 || @ Angels || 4–1 || Thomson (7–8) || Watson (11–9) || DiPoto (12) || 19,614 || 69–70
|-  style="text-align:center; background:#bfb;"
| 140 || September 2 || @ Angels || 7–2 || Astacio (9–9) || Dickson (13–7) || Munoz (2) || 18,266 || 70–70
|-  style="text-align:center; background:#bfb;"
| 141 || September 5 || Cardinals || 11–4 || Castillo (11–11) || Osborne (3–7) || || 48,051 || 71–70
|-  style="text-align:center; background:#fbb;"
| 142 || September 6 || Cardinals || 10–7 (13) || Eckersley (1–4) || McCurry (1–4) || Petkovsek (2) || 48,017 || 71–71
|-  style="text-align:center; background:#bfb;"
| 143 || September 6 || Cardinals || 7–6 || Holmes (7–2) || King (3–1) || || 44,288 || 72–71
|-  style="text-align:center; background:#bfb;"
| 144 || September 7 || Cardinals || 7–4 || Astacio (10–9) || Petkovsek (4–6) || || 48,011 || 73–71
|-  style="text-align:center; background:#fbb;"
| 145 || September 9 || Astros || 7–4 || Hampton (13–9) || Wright (6–11) || Springer (3) || 48,039 || 73–72
|-  style="text-align:center; background:#bfb;"
| 146 || September 10 || Astros || 9–7 || Leskanic (4–0) || Magnante (3–1) || DiPoto (13) || 42,321 || 74–72
|-  style="text-align:center; background:#bfb;"
| 147 || September 12 || @ Braves || 3–1 || Munoz (3–3) || Wohlers (5–6) || DiPoto (14) || 47,772 || 75–72
|-  style="text-align:center; background:#bfb;"
| 148 || September 13 || @ Braves || 10–6 || Holmes (8–2) || Cather (0–4) || DeJean (2) || 49,097 || 76–72
|-  style="text-align:center; background:#bfb;"
| 149 || September 14 || @ Braves || 4–0 || Astacio (11–9) || Smoltz (14–12) || || 46,245 || 77–72
|-  style="text-align:center; background:#bfb;"
| 150 || September 15 || @ Marlins || 7–1 || Wright (7–11) || Fernandez (17–11) || || 19,148 || 78–72
|-  style="text-align:center; background:#fbb;"
| 151 || September 16 || @ Marlins || 9–6 || Powell (7–2) || DiPoto (5–3) || || 21,990 || 78–73
|-  style="text-align:center; background:#fbb;"
| 152 || September 17 || @ Padres || 5–4 || Ashby (9–11) || Thomson (7–9) || Hoffman (35) || 15,768 || 78–74
|-  style="text-align:center; background:#fbb;"
| 153 || September 18 || @ Padres || 7–6 || Menhart (2–2) || Bailey (9–10) || Hoffman (36) || 15,067 || 78–75
|-  style="text-align:center; background:#bfb;"
| 154 || September 19 || @ Dodgers || 6–4 || Astacio (12–9) || Nomo (13–12) || DiPoto (15) || 53,408 || 79–75
|-  style="text-align:center; background:#bfb;"
| 155 || September 20 || @ Dodgers || 2–1 || Wright (8–11) || Osuna (3–4) || DiPoto (16) || 45,780 || 80–75
|-  style="text-align:center; background:#bfb;"
| 156 || September 21 || @ Dodgers || 10–5 || Castillo (12–11) || Martínez (9–5) || || 53,903 || 81–75
|-  style="text-align:center; background:#bfb;"
| 157 || September 23 || Giants || 7–6 || Holmes (9–2) || Darwin (5–11) || Leskanic (2) || 48,026 || 82–75
|-  style="text-align:center; background:#fbb;"
| 158 || September 24 || Giants || 4–3 || Hernández (10–3) || Reed (4–6) || || 48,035 || 82–76
|-  style="text-align:center; background:#fbb;"
| 159 || September 25 || Dodgers || 9–5 || Nomo (14–12) || Astacio (12–10) || || 48,020 || 82–77
|-  style="text-align:center; background:#fbb;"
| 160 || September 26 || Dodgers || 10–4 || Valdez (10–11) || Wright (8–12) || || 48,016 || 82–78
|-  style="text-align:center; background:#fbb;"
| 161 || September 27 || Dodgers || 6–1 || Martínez (10–5) || Castillo (12–12) || || 48,125 || 82–79
|-  style="text-align:center; background:#bfb;"
| 162 || September 28 || Dodgers || 13–9 ||  DeJean (5–0) || Reyes (2–3) || || 48,197 || 83–79
|-

Player statistics

Batting

Pitching

Starting pitchers 
Note: G = Games pitched; IP = Innings pitched; W = Wins; L = Losses; ERA = Earned run average; SO = Strikeouts

Other pitchers 
Note: G = Games pitched; IP = Innings pitched; W = Wins; L = Losses; ERA = Earned run average; SO = Strikeouts

Relief pitchers 
Note: G = Games pitched; W = Wins; L = Losses; SV = Saves; ERA = Earned run average; SO = Strikeouts

Awards, league leaders, and accomplishments

National League leaders

Offensive statistics
 At bats per home run: Larry Walker (11.6)
 Extra base hits: Larry Walker (99) †
 Home runs: Larry Walker (49)
 Offensive win %: Larry Walker (.857) †
 On-base percentage: Larry Walker (.452)
 On-base plus slugging percentage: Larry Walker (1.172) †
 Power–speed number: Larry Walker (39.4)
 Runs batted in: Andrés Galarraga (140)
 Slugging percentage: Larry Walker (.720) †
 Total bases: Larry Walker (409) †
 Wins Above Replacement: Larry Walker (9.8) †
 Notes: † – led MLB.  References:

Defensive statistics
 Assists at third base: Vinny Castilla (323) 
 Double plays turned: 
 at first base: Andrés Galarraga (176)
 at third base: Vinny Castilla (41) 
 all outfielders and at right field: Larry Walker (4)
 at center field: Quinton McCracken (3)
 Fielding percentage: 
 at left field: Dante Bichette (.991)
 at right field: Larry Walker (.992)
 at pitcher: Roger Bailey (1.000)
 Putouts for all fielders and at first base: Andrés Galarraga (1,458)
 Range factor per game:
 at first base: Andrés Galarraga (10.23)
 at shortstop: Walt Weiss (4.73)
 Range factor per nine innings:
 at first base: Andrés Galarraga (10.69)
 at shortstop: Walt Weiss (5.22)
 at pitcher: Roger Bailey (3.06)
 References:

Awards
 All-Star Game selectees:
 Andrés Galarraga
 Larry Walker (starter at right field)
 Baseball Digest Player of the Year: Larry Walker
 Colorado Rockies Player of the Year: Larry Walker
 National League Most Valuable Player (MVP): Larry Walker
 National League Player of the Month: Larry Walker (April)
 National League Players of the Week:
 2× Larry Walker (April 6 & September 21)
 Vinny Castilla (April 13)
 Ellis Burks (May 25)
 Dante Bichette (July 27)
 Rawlings Gold Glove at outfield: Larry Walker
 Silver Slugger
 at third base: Vinny Castilla 
 at outfield: Larry Walker
 Tip O'Neill Award: Larry Walker

Farm system

LEAGUE CHAMPIONS: Portland

See also

 30–30 club
 List of Colorado Rockies team records
 List of Gold Glove Award winners at outfield
 List of Major League Baseball annual home run leaders
 List of Major League Baseball annual putouts leaders
 List of Major League Baseball annual runs batted in leaders
 List of National League annual slugging percentage leaders
 List of Silver Slugger Award winners at third base
 List of Silver Slugger Award winners at outfield

References and notes

References
1997 Colorado Rockies at Baseball Reference
1997 Colorado Rockies team page at www.baseball-almanac.com

Colorado Rockies seasons
Colorado Rockies season
Colorado Rockies season
1990s in Denver